Frenchtown is an unincorporated community in Wayne Township, Darke County, Ohio, United States. Its elevation is 1,027 feet (313 m).

History
The community was settled in the early nineteenth century primarily by people of French descent, including many Alsatians and Lorrainers.  These settlers long retained their French roots: into the late nineteenth century, the community was heavily Roman Catholic, and their public inscriptions were made in the French language.  Although stores and a school were founded in Frenchtown soon after settlement, no post office was ever established there; residents' mail went to the Versailles post office.  Since the nineteenth century, the community has shrunk considerably; little now remains of Frenchtown except houses and a church complex.  This church, Holy Family Catholic Church, is a community landmark: built in the 1860s, it is listed on the National Register of Historic Places.

References

Unincorporated communities in Darke County, Ohio
French-American culture in Ohio
Unincorporated communities in Ohio